Shamila Kohestani is an Afghan footballer, and the former captain of the Afghanistan women's national football team. She attended boarding school in the United States at Blair Academy in Blairstown, New Jersey. In 2007, she scored six goals at the women's team's first tournament. In 2006, she won the Arthur Ashe Courage Award.

Kohestani traveled to the United States in 2004 as part of a football clinic hosted by Afghan Youth Sports Exchange, a program founded by Awista Ayub. In early 2006, she participated in the program's clinic in Kabul. In 2006 she attended the Julie Foudy Soccer Leadership Academy (JFSLA) in Hightstown, New Jersey. After graduating from Blair Academy, Shamila went on to attend Drew University in Madison, NJ and graduated in 2012.

As a sports advocate, Shamila has spoken about the importance of soccer/football and how it empowered her and her team to tear down societal norms and make history in a war-torn country. Shamila has been vocal about women's issues around the globe and the life-changing opportunities playing sports can provide. She has spoken at high schools, universities, conferences, and fundraising events in the United States. Shamila's speeches are focused on how soccer and other sports can be utilized to promote gender equality and build confidence in young women around the world.

References

External links 
 Kohestani's talk at TEDx Women February 2012 – TEDxUNC - How Sports Impact the Lives of Women
 Drew University player profile
 “Afghanistan: Prosecute Abuse of Women football Players,” Human Rights Watch, February 2019.
 “Standing up against abuse with Afghanistan Women's National Football Team”, FreeWomenWriter, January 2019. 
 “I am pretty sure sexual abuse is happening at the global level”, The telegraph.co.uk, December 2018
 “FIFA Investigate Afghanistan Football Federation”, CNN International, December 2018.
 “Empowering Young Women through Sports in Afghanistan and around the World”, Free Women Writer, February 2017.
 “Afghan notebook: Sporting chance”, BBC, June 2014 
 “End Zone: Soccer Star Leaves Taliban Behind”, New York Daily News, October 2008
 “Soccer as an Escape to Hope for Afghan Teenager”, New York Times, February 2008. 
 “Afghanistan: Once Whipped by Taliban, Girl Makes Mark as Soccer Star”, Radio Free Europe, September 2007. 
 “The Century Council 20 People to Watch”, The Century Council, October 2011.

July 2013 - Girls' Soccer in the Taliban's Wake

December 2012 – TEDxWomen – Empowering Women Through Soccer

October 2012 – ESPNW – Imagine the life of Shamila Kohestani

April 2008 – Giant Steps Award – Barrier Breaker

June 2006 – The Arthur Ashe Courage Award

Living people
Afghan women's footballers
Year of birth missing (living people)
Afghanistan women's international footballers
Footballers from Kabul
Women's association football forwards